Elite Care, based in Portland, Oregon, is an elderly care company that operates assisted living facilities in the Pacific Northwest. Their corporate offices are located in Tigard, OR, and they employ over 120 employees. As of July 2013, they housed over 110 total residents.

Company info
Elite Care founders are husband-and-wife team Bill Reed and Lydia Lundberg.

Elite Care operates three communities: Elite Care at Oatfield Estates, in Milwaukie, OR, opened in 2000; Elite Care at Fanno Creek, in Tigard, OR, opened in 2008; and Sylvan Park in Vancouver, WA, opened in 2013.

Technology
Elite Care has a patented tracking technology which allows for Elite Care staff (and resident family members, online) to locate and check on residents from afar.

The company’s advisory committee included representatives from the Mayo Clinic, Harvard University, Providence Health System, Intel, University of Michigan, University of Wisconsin, Oregon Health Sciences University, Eindhoven University of Technology, and Sandia National Laboratory.

The system has bolstered national media attention for the company.

Awards and recognition
Elite Care’s approach to resident housing, nutrition, staffing, activities, and technology has been nationally recognized by MSNBC, USA Today, and The Wall Street Journal. The latter writing that Elite Care is "One of the best examples of applied technology in U.S. long-term elder care" in their July 25 publication in 2002, and received positive attention as well from the Chicago Tribune and Wired magazine. Brian Williams of NBC Nightly News described Elite Care as "The model for the future of caring for aging parents." 

In 2001 Elite Care received one of 10 Computerworld Honors Program 21st Century Achievement Awards for their "smart home health care system" in 2001.

See also
 List of companies based in Oregon

References

Companies based in Portland, Oregon
Geriatrics
Privately held companies based in Oregon
Healthcare in Portland, Oregon